Club Deportivo Villa de Fortuna is a Spanish football club based in Fortuna, in the Region of Murcia. Founded in 2015, they play in Preferente Autonómica – Group 2, holding home games at the Complejo Municipal Fortuna José Luis Belda, with a capacity of 1,000 people.

History
Founded in 2015 to replace absorbed PMD Fortuna in the city, Villa de Fortuna started playing in the Segunda Autonómica, the lowest tier of Murcian football, and achieved immediate promotion as champions. Another promotion followed in 2018, after the club finished third in the Primera Autonómica.

Villa de Fortuna subsequently established themselves in the Preferente Autonómica, reaching the final of the promotion play-offs in 2020–21 but losing to CD Bala Azul; the club still qualified to the 2021–22 Copa del Rey, knocking out CA Espeleño in the preliminary rounds but being subsequently eliminated by Cádiz CF in the first round.

Season to season

References

External links
 
Soccerway team profile

Football clubs in the Region of Murcia
Association football clubs established in 2015
2015 establishments in Spain